The Domain Wintergardens is a complex of gardens located within the Pukekawa / Auckland Domain. It is registered with the New Zealand Historic Places Trust as a Category I historic place.

Description
The Wintergardens consists of two large glasshouses: one non-heated Temperate House and one Tropical House (heated to an average of 28 °C). In between the two glasshouses there is an ornate courtyard with several neoclassical statues and a sunken pond in the centre. Off to one side is the Fernery which is situated in a former scoria quarry in the side of the small volcanic cone named Pukekaroro.

History
The Domain Wintergardens were constructed following World War I with funds generated from the Industrial, Agricultural and Mining Exhibition of 1913-1914 (which was held at the same site). Additional funding for the Wintergardens came from a variety of other local benefactors. Perhaps most significantly was local businessman Sir George Elliot, who was the chairman of the exhibition, and also chairman of the Bank of New Zealand.

The Pukekawa / Auckland Domain had been a public park since 1844 but was considered to be an area that was frequented by "undesirables". The Wintergardens were considered to be part of the gentrification of the park, providing an attraction for people in the area during the winter months.

Construction
The gardens were designed by Gummer and Ford, showing considerable influence from the English partnership of Edwin Lutyens and Gertrude Jekyll and the Arts and Crafts movement.

Initially only the Temperate House was built. This was opened and presented to the people of Auckland on 12 October 1921. The courtyard, the Tropical House, and the Fernery were added later in the 1920s. The initial stage cost £4000 to build. The second stage was constructed by Fletcher Building at a cost of £19500.

The Mayor of Auckland City, George Baildon, officially opened the completed Wintergardens on 2 May 1928.

Renovations
Many of the statues in the courtyard were added in 1945, and the sunken pond in the centre of the gardens was installed in 1954.
A significant reconstruction project was undertaken during 1993 and 1994 to renovate the Wintergardens.

On 1 December 2013, the Tropical House of the Wintergardens became the first place in New Zealand to have the giant Amorphophallus titanum in flower. This plant can take 10 years to flower, with the flower smelling of rotting flesh.

References

External links
New Zealand Historic Places Entry for the Domain Wintergardens
Auckland Council Parks Entry for the Domain Wintergardens
Photographs of the Domain Wintergardens held in Auckland Libraries' heritage collections.

Heritage New Zealand Category 1 historic places in the Auckland Region
Buildings and structures in Auckland
Tourist attractions in Auckland
Auckland Domain
Parnell, New Zealand